Arsen Petrosyan (born on 27 September 1991 in Yerevan, Armenia) is a retired Armenian football player who last played as a goalkeeper for the Armenia national football team and for Armenian Premier League club FC Alashkert.

Club career
Early in his career, he played in the Armenian First League with a team of young men 17 years of age. In 2009, Petrosyan went to Gandzasar Kapan. Apart from him at the club was his older brother, Alexander Petrosyan, and head coach who was their father, Samvel Petrosyan. That season Arsen was able to play only one game. After the departure of his father from the coaching staff, he left the club after the end of the season.

Pyunik
The next club in Petrosyan's career became the reigning Armenian Premier League champion Pyunik Yerevan. Because of the high competition in the club, Petrosyan could not play starting goalkeeper. His competition was Karen Israelyan. In late 2010, the core team made drastic changes. The two main goalkeepers, Artur Lesko and Edward Hovhannisyan, left the team. Thus, to fill the vacancy for this role, the coaching staff had to decide between Petrosyan and Israelyan. In addition, in early 2011, the club acquired Serbian goalkeeper Đorđe Pantić. However, after three games, because of a large percentage of transfers between the matches, the management promptly terminated the contract with the Serbian goalkeeper. For the entire 2011 season, Petrosyan and Israelyan alternately played in the league and cup competitions. In a list of the most reliable goalkeeper of the 2011 season, Petrosyan took 5th. In early January 2012, Karen Israelyan was leaving the club. Petrosyan took the place at the heart of the team. Not having competition, Petrosyan began to make periodic errors in the matches, leading to missed goals. The credibility of the Petrosyan fell slightly, and he was periodically substituted with second goalkeeper Albert Ohanyan.

Ararat
In the summer transfer window, Petrosyan signed a contract with Ararat Yerevan. The club changed the orientation of the local players, leaving some without any playing time. Along with Petrosyan, to the club came Hayk Mkrtchyan and Gevorg Nranyan.

Ararat Yerevan
On 8 July 2017, Petrosyan signed for FC Ararat Yerevan.

International career
In the Armenia U21 youth team, Petrosyan played 3 matches. Petrosyan debuted in the core Armenia national football team on 11 October 2011 in a scandalous game against Ireland when first goalkeeper Roman Berezovsky was controversially shown a red card. He was penalized for handball in the first few minutes, though replays clearly showed his hands never touched the ball. In that game, Arsen missed two goals, one of which was accidentally scored by teammate Valeri Aleksanyan. Armenia lost 1–2 and missed their chance to qualify for the UEFA Euro 2012.

Personal life
His father Samvel Petrosyan is a former player of Ararat Yerevan and now a football coach. Arsen has an older brother, Alexander, who is also a professional football player.

Honours

Club
Pyunik Yerevan
Armenian Supercup (1): 2011

References

External links
FFA.am

Armfootball.tripod.com

1991 births
Living people
Footballers from Yerevan
Armenian footballers
Association football goalkeepers
Armenia international footballers
Armenia under-21 international footballers
FC Pyunik players
FC Ararat Yerevan players
Armenian Premier League players